Tareq AL-Shammari (Arabic: طارق الشمري born 5 August 1984 in Kuwait City, Kuwait) is a Kuwaiti former professional footballer who is last known to have been assigned to Al-Yarmouk SC of the Kuwaiti Premier League.

Yarmuk

Forming a cordial relationship with Brazilian coach da Silva during his time with Kazma, Al-Shammari sealed a move to Al-Yarmouk SC in 2016 with da Silva's assistance, nicknamed Abotreka after the retired Egyptian footballer.

References

External links 
 at National-Football-Teams

Association football midfielders
Sportspeople from Kuwait City
Kuwaiti expatriate footballers
Kuwait international footballers
Kazma SC players
Al-Orouba SC players
Living people
1985 births
Kuwaiti footballers
Expatriate footballers in Oman
Kuwaiti expatriate sportspeople in Oman
Al Salmiya SC players
Al-Yarmouk SC (Kuwait) players
Al-Arabi SC (Kuwait) players
Kuwait Premier League players